The  is a private museum of Ainu materials collected by Kayano Shigeru that opened in the Nibutani area of Biratori, Hokkaidō, Japan in 1992.

History
Kayano Shigeru (1926–2006) started collecting tools and other items used in traditional Ainu daily life in 1952. In 1972 the  opened in the building that now serves as the Kayano Shigeru Nibutani Ainu Museum, with some two thousand objects he had acquired. When the Nibutani Ainu Culture Museum opened a short distance away in 1992, the collection of the old museum was transferred in its entirety to the new museum, and the old building repurposed as a private museum for his rebuilt personal collection. By March 2003, the museum had some 4,000 objects. 202 of these, along with 919 items from the Nibutani Ainu Culture Museum, all relating to the daily life of the local Ainu, have together been designated an Important Tangible Folk Cultural Property.

See also
 Historical Museum of the Saru River
 List of Important Tangible Folk Cultural Properties
 List of Historic Sites of Japan (Hokkaidō)
 Hokkaido Museum
 Ainu culture

References

External links
 Kayano Shigeru Nibutani Ainu Museum 

Museums in Hokkaido
History of Hokkaido
Museums established in 1992
1992 establishments in Japan
Ainu
Ethnic museums
Biratori, Hokkaido